Hardcore for Syria is a punk and hardcore punk compilation album put together with 30 bands from around the world. It was released as a free download by Hardcore4Syria, an online media awareness project established to support the victims of the humanitarian crisis in Syria.

Track listing 

Hardcore for Syria, Vol. 1 :

 "Borrow and Bomb" — Off! — 0:44 — United States
 "Tahrir Square Dance" — The Kominas — 1:39 — USA
 "The Ranks of the Masses Rising" — Anti-Flag — 2:28 — USA
 "We Will Stop You" — ZSK — 3:17 — Germany
 "Different Hearts, Different Minds" — Atlas Losing Grip — 3:06 — Sweden
 "Can't Have Me" — Agent Attitude — 1:34 — Sweden
 "Never Negotiate" — Raised Fist — 2:55 — Sweden
 "Big Slice" — Unhold — 4:37 — Switzerland
 "Wounded Tiger Bites Harder" — Onesta — 2:14 — France
 "Guilty" — Animal Instinct — 1:06 — Switzerland
 "Skindeep" — This is History — 1:37 — Netherlands
 "Wild World" — Word Up! — 1:05 — Australia
 "Saving Private Honesty" — Waterdown — 3:07 — Germany
 "Not What You Think" — Crank — 2:58 — Australia
 "The New Age" — The Go Set — 3:42 — Australia
 "City Lights" — Parties Break Hearts — 3:59 — Switzerland
 "Stand Your Ground" — Ticking Bombs — 2:12 — Sweden
 "Bastards Way" — The Strapones — 2:21 — Switzerland
 "Together We're Stronger" — 59 Times the Pain — 1:18 — Sweden
 "Time 2 Fight" — Topnovil — 1:49 — Australia
 "Vi Har Fått Nog" ("We've Had Enough") — Kvoteringen — 2:48 — Sweden
 "Bullets and Tear Gas" — Zinc — 3:51 — Syria
 "Bitte Was?!" ("Say What?") — Entwaffnung — 1:44 — Switzerland
 "Gravity on Hold" — Anti-Everything — 2:53 — Trinidad And Tobago
 "Think Global, Act Local" — Play to Destroy — 2:30 — Switzerland
 "Child Curse" — Bearfoot — 2:40 — USA
 "Suicidal Pathway" — Unveil — 2:45 — Switzerland
 "Born To Ruin" — Swarm — 4:58 — Sweden
 "Demokrati?" ("Democracy?") — Desperat — 1:31 — Sweden
 "Psalm of the Sniper" — Al Thawra — 9:10 — USA

See also 
 Syrian civil war

References

External links

 
 

2012 compilation albums
Hardcore punk compilation albums
Punk rock compilation albums
Charity albums